Sueus niisimai, is a species of weevil found in India, Sri Lanka, China, Japan, Taiwan, Korea, Malaysia and Indonesia. It is also found in Australia and Fiji, presumably introduced.

Description
Body length excluding head is about 1.6 to 2.0 mm. Body elongate is oval and slightly flattened. Body reddish brown. Antennae and tarsi yellowish brown. Compound eyes divided into two parts where the upper ones are located almost on frons and lower ones are located behind scrobe ventrally. Pronotum wider than long, shiny with minute shallow punctures. Pronotum clothed with whitish hairy pubescence. Scutellum shiny, small and triangular. Elytra long, parallel-sided, and slightly flattened.

Biology
A polyphagous weevil, the host plants of the adults are mainly broaden leaves trees such as orange, Commersonia bartramia, Cryptocarya constricta and Macaranga. Females generally constructs galleries in old dry twigs. This gallery system consists of a radial gallery, and usually two longitudinal branches running up and down the stem. Eggs are laid in separate niches, where the larvae develop by feeding on the ambrosia fungus growing in the parental gallery. Usually, only one or two males are produced in each gallery with majority of females. Males are smaller than the females, where they mate with their sisters in the parental gallery.

The Canker disease fungus Diatrypella japonica is identified as a symbiote associated with the adult weevils.

References 

Curculionidae
Insects of Sri Lanka
Insects described in 1926